Michael Magnesi (born 18 November 1994) is an Italian professional boxer.

Professional career
Magnesi made his professional debut on 10 October 2015, scoring a four-round points decision (PTS) victory against Carmelo Palermo at Palasport V.le Tiziano in Rome, Italy.

After compiling a record of 11–0 (4 KOs), he defeated Francesco Invernizio via third-round technical knockout (TKO), capturing the vacant Italian super-featherweight title on 30 June 2018 at the Piazza Dante in Grosseto, Italy.

He retained the title with a unanimous decision (UD) victory against Giuseppe Carafa in November, before defeating Ruddy Encarnacion via fourth-round corner retirement (RTD) on 24 March 2019 in Rome, capturing the vacant IBF Mediterranean super-featherweight title.

He next defeated Emanuel López via tenth-round knockout (KO) on 21 June, capturing the vacant WBC International Silver super-featherweight title at the Parco della Pace in Rome.

Following a stoppage victory against Maxwell Awuku in a non-title fight in October, Magnesi won his third regional title on 29 February 2020 after defeating Breilor Teran via fourth-round RTD to capture the vacant IBO Inter-Continental super-featherweight title at the Tiburtina TV Studios in Rome.

In his next fight he faced Patrick Kinigamazi for the vacant IBO super-featherweight title on 27 November 2020 in Fondi, Italy. Magnesi knocked Kinigamazi to the floor in the third round en route to a fifth-round KO victory.

Professional boxing record

References

External links

Living people
1994 births
Italian male boxers
Sportspeople from the Metropolitan City of Rome Capital
Super-featherweight boxers
International Boxing Organization champions
People from Palestrina